Madeleine Jouffroy (born 20 November 1927) is a French gymnast. She competed in seven events at the 1952 Summer Olympics.

References

1927 births
Living people
French female artistic gymnasts
Olympic gymnasts of France
Gymnasts at the 1952 Summer Olympics
People from Chalon-sur-Saône
Sportspeople from Saône-et-Loire
20th-century French women